The electoral district of Yuroke was an electoral district of the Victorian Legislative Assembly. It was situated in the outer northern suburbs of Melbourne and was created in a redistribution before the 2002 state election, replacing the former electorate of Tullamarine.

Included within its boundaries were Attwood,  Craigieburn, Greenvale, Kalkallo, Mickleham and Yuroke, as well as parts of Roxburgh Park, Somerton, and Westmeadows.

It was considered to be a very safe Labor Party seat.

The seat was abolished by the Electoral Boundaries Commission ahead of the 2022 election and replaced by the electoral districts of Kalkallo and Greenvale.

Members for Yuroke

Election results

See also
 Parliaments of the Australian states and territories
 List of members of the Victorian Legislative Assembly

References

External links
 Electorate profile: Yuroke District, Victorian Electoral Commission

2002 establishments in Australia
Former electoral districts of Victoria (Australia)
2022 disestablishments in Australia